Thomas Emerson Scott Jr. (born April 27, 1948) is a former United States district judge of the United States District Court for the Southern District of Florida. He is currently an attorney in private practice.

Education and career

Scott was born in Pittsburgh, Pennsylvania. He received a Bachelor of Arts degree from the University of Miami in 1969. He received a Juris Doctor from the University of Miami School of Law in 1972. He received a Master of Laws from the University of Virginia School of Law in 1989. He was in the United States Army as a First Lieutenant in 1969. He was in private practice of law in Miami, Florida from 1972 to 1976. He was in private practice of law in Fort Lauderdale, Florida from 1976 to 1977. He was in private practice of law in Miami from 1977 to 1979. He was a Judge of the Circuit Court of Florida in Miami from 1980 to 1984. He was in private practice of law in Fort Lauderdale from 1984 to 1985.

He was an instructor at the University of Miami in Coral Gables, Florida from 1984 to 1986.

Federal judicial service

Scott was nominated by President Ronald Reagan on June 20, 1985, to the United States District Court for the Southern District of Florida, to a new seat created by 98 Stat. 333. He was confirmed by the United States Senate on July 16, 1985, and received commission on July 18, 1985. His service was terminated on October 31, 1990, due to resignation.

Post judicial service

Following his resignation from the federal bench, Scott resumed private practice in Miami. From 1997 to 2000, he served as the United States Attorney for the Southern District of Florida, having been appointed by President Bill Clinton. He then returned to private practice in Miami. He is currently a named partner at the law firm of Cole, Scott & Kissane, P.A., in Miami.

References

Sources
 

1948 births
Living people
Florida state court judges
Judges of the United States District Court for the Southern District of Florida
United States district court judges appointed by Ronald Reagan
20th-century American judges
United States Attorneys for the Southern District of Florida
University of Miami alumni
University of Miami School of Law alumni
University of Miami faculty